Shivling may refer to:
 Lingam, a representation of Shiva
 Shivalinga (2016 film), Kannada film
 Shivalinga (2017 film), Tamil/Telugu/Hindi film
 Shivling (mountain), a mountain in Uttarakhand
 Shivaling, Nepal